Dean Ward (born 30 June 1963 in Portsmouth, England) is a British bobsledder who competed from 1991 to 2002. Competing in three Winter Olympics, he won a bronze medal in the four-man event (tied with France) at Nagano in 1998. Ward made his first appearance in the media when he was filmed by the BBC 1 for their 1982 documentary, The Paras, which charted the progress of young recruits attempting to become members of the Parachute Regiment on the eve of the Falklands War.

References

 BBC profile on Ward at 2002 Winter Olympics in Salt Lake City.
 Bobsleigh four-man Olympic medalists for 1924, 1932–56, and since 1964

1963 births
Sportspeople from Portsmouth
Bobsledders at the 1994 Winter Olympics
Bobsledders at the 1998 Winter Olympics
Bobsledders at the 2002 Winter Olympics
British male bobsledders
Olympic bobsledders of Great Britain
Olympic bronze medallists for Great Britain
Living people
British Parachute Regiment soldiers
Olympic medalists in bobsleigh
Medalists at the 1998 Winter Olympics